Civil List Act may refer to 

 Civil List Act 1697, an Act of the Parliament of England
 Civil List Act 1727, an Act of the Parliament of Great Britain
 Civil List Act 1760, an Act of the Parliament of Great Britain
 Civil List Act 1837, an Act of the Parliament of the United Kingdom
 Civil List Act 1979, an Act of the Parliament of New Zealand
 Civil List and Secret Service Money Act 1782, an Act of the Parliament of Great Britain